Mr. Skeffington is a 1944 American drama film directed by Vincent Sherman, based on the 1940 novel of the same name by Elizabeth von Arnim.

The film stars Bette Davis as a beautiful but self-centered woman who has many suitors but marries Job Skeffington, played by Claude Rains, solely to save her brother from going to prison. It also makes a point about Skeffington's status as a Jew in 1914 high society and later in relation to Nazi Germany. Supporting actors include Walter Abel, George Coulouris and Richard Waring.

Plot
In 1914, spoiled Fanny Trellis is a renowned beauty with many suitors. She loves her brother Trippy and would do anything to help him. Fanny learns that Trippy has embezzled money from his employer Job Skeffington. To save her brother from prosecution, Fanny pursues and marries the lovestruck Skeffington. Disgusted by the arrangement, in part because of his prejudice against Skeffington being Jewish, Trippy leaves home to fight in the Lafayette Escadrille in World War I.

Job loves Fanny, but she is merely fond of him and largely ignores him. She becomes pregnant with his child, but when Trippy dies in France, she states she is "stuck" with Job, and the marriage then becomes wholly loveless, continuing only for the child's sake. Job and George Trellis, Fanny's cousin, also enlist but are stationed near home.

Fanny enjoys playing the wealthy socialite, stringing along a persistent quartet of suitors who are unfazed by her marriage, as well as much younger lovers. Lonely, Job finds solace with his secretaries. When Fanny finds out, she divorces him, conveniently ignoring her own behavior.

Fanny neglects her young daughter (also named Fanny), who understandably prefers her loving father and begs him to take her with him to Europe. Although Job fears for his child and tries unsuccessfully to explain to her the nature of prejudice she will encounter as a Jew abroad, he finally, tearfully and joyfully, says yes. Fanny is relieved to be free of the encumbrance of a child. Fanny has a series of affairs, living well on the extremely generous settlement Job has left her - half his fortune - and hardly giving a thought to her daughter, whom she does not see for many years.

She retains her beauty as she grows older (much to the envy of her women acquaintances), but when she catches diphtheria, it ravages her appearance. In denial, she invites her old lovers (and their wives) to a party. The men are shocked (and the women relieved) by how much Fanny has changed, leaving her distraught. Her latest young suitor, Johnny Mitchell, falls in love with her daughter, who has returned from Europe because of the rise of the Nazis. They marry after only a few months and leave for Seattle. Fanny's daughter explains that, while she wishes her mother well, she feels no real love for her, and pities her for discarding the one man who truly loves her. Shortly before her daughter's departure, Fanny suffers the ultimate humiliation when one of her old beaux makes what she at first believes to be a sincere marriage proposal, only to withdraw it when he begins to suspect, incorrectly, that she is no longer wealthy. Fanny is left alone with her maid, Manby.

Fanny's cousin George brings Job back to Fanny's home unannounced. The Nazis have left Job penniless and worse, George tells Fanny, and he calls on her to be generous. Fanny's vanity nearly prevents her from venturing down her home's grand staircase to see Job.

When she does finally enter the parlor, Job moves to her, stumbles and falls: He is blind (due to torture in a Nazi concentration camp). Fanny rushes to cradle him in her arms. As she takes his arm and guides him up the staircase, she tells the maid that "Mr. Skeffington has come home." Job had once, long ago, told Fanny that, "A woman is beautiful only when she is loved." George tells Fanny that, at that moment, she has "never been more beautiful." At long last, she realizes the truth of it.

Cast
 Bette Davis as Frances Beatrice 'Fanny' Trellis Skeffington
 Claude Rains as Job Skeffington
 Walter Abel as George Trellis, Fanny's cousin
 Richard Waring as Trippy Trellis, Fanny's brother
 Marjorie Riordan as Fanny Rachel Trellis, Fanny and Job's daughter as an adult
 Robert Shayne as MacMahon, a local gangster
 John Alexander as Jim Conderley, one of Fanny's four persistent suitors
 Jerome Cowan as Edward Morrison, one of Fanny's four persistent suitors
 Peter Whitney as Chester Forbish, one of Fanny's four persistent suitors
 Bill Kennedy as Bill Thatcher, one of Fanny's four persistent suitors
 Johnny Mitchell as Johnny Mitchell, a younger suitor of Fanny's who later marries her daughter. Born Douglas Lamy, this actor changed his name to that of his character.
 George Coulouris as Doctor Byles
 Dorothy Peterson as Manby, Fanny's housekeeper
 Creighton Hale as Casey (uncredited) 
 Halliwell Hobbes as Soames (uncredited) 
 Ethan Laidlaw as Cop (uncredited)
 Jack Mower as Man (uncredited)
 Will Stanton as Sid Lapham (uncredited)

Production
Paul Henreid says he was offered the male lead but turned it down as he felt he would not be convincing as a man who looked on passively while his wife had affairs.

According to the 1989 book Bette & Joan: The Divine Feud by Shaun Considine, Davis was going through intense personal torments at this time, which was reflected in her treatment of co-stars on this film, and several others at the time, culminating in a vicious personal attack. Apparently, while Davis was away from her dressing room, the eyewash she always used after filming the day's scenes had been poisoned, causing Davis to scream out in pain. Director Vincent Sherman, with whom Davis had once been romantically involved, admitted to the detectives investigating the incident, "If you asked everyone on the set who would have committed such a thing, everyone would raise their hand!" Even Bette Davis is quoted as saying "Only a mother could have loved me at this point in my life."

Box office
According to the Warner Bros. records, the film earned $2,456,000 domestically and $1,365,000 foreign.

Reception 
On the review aggregator website Rotten Tomatoes, 57% of 7 critics' reviews are positive, with an average rating of 5.9/10.

Awards
Bette Davis was nominated for the Oscar for Best Actress, and Claude Rains was nominated for Best Supporting Actor.

References

External links

 
 
 
 
 Mr. Skeffington on Lux Radio Theater: October 1, 1945

1944 films
American black-and-white films
Warner Bros. films
Films scored by Franz Waxman
Films directed by Vincent Sherman
Films set in the 1910s
Films based on British novels
Films about Jews and Judaism
Films set in New York City
Films with screenplays by Julius J. Epstein
Films with screenplays by Philip G. Epstein
Films scored by Paul Dessau
American historical drama films
1940s historical drama films
1944 drama films
1940s English-language films
1940s American films